The thirty-second edition of the Caribbean Series (Serie del Caribe) was played in . It was held from February 5 through February 11 with the champions teams from the Dominican Republic, Leones del Escogido; Mexico, Naranjeros de Hermosillo; Puerto Rico, Senadores de San Juan, and Venezuela, Leones del Caracas. The format consisted of 12 games, each team facing the other teams twice, and was played at Miami Orange Bowl in Miami, Florida.

Summary
The four-team, round-robin tournament was brought to Miami after it ran into dire economic woes in Caribbean countries. In a botched experiment, the Series games were played in the now defunct Orange Bowl, which had not been used for baseball since 1956, when the legendary Satchel Paige pitched there in an exhibition game.

According to series organizers, the facility was chosen because of its proximity to the city's Latin community. But because of the way it was built, the Orange Bowl was not suitable for baseball. As a result, makeshift conditions in the old ballpark led to poor infield play, which was pockmarked and worn down from use during a recent soccer tournament. Since the start, there had been numerous bad hops and infielders were visibly shying away from ground balls, resulting in high scoring games. In addition, players and managers were annoyed at the park`s dimensions. It was only 250 feet down the left-field line, according to Series officials, but those who played on it believe it was closer to 220 feet.

The Dominican Leones del Escogido won the competition with a 5-1 record and were managed by Felipe Alou. The club got a fine offensive performance from outfielder and Series MVP Gerónimo Berroa, who hit .300 with four home runs and eight runs batted in, including two homers and five RBI in the decisive game against the Senadores de San Juan of Puerto Rico, who tied for second with the Leones del Caracas of Venezuela.

The last-place Naranjeros de Hermosillo finished with a 1-5 record, but included batting champion Cornelio García (.520) and catcher Homar Rojas in the All-Star team. In addition, Barry Jones of Puerto Rico smashed five home runs to tie the single-series record set by Rico Carty in the 1977 tournament. A left-handed pull hitter, Jones achieved the feat easily, thanks to the controversial shortened left-field fence required by the patchwork Orange Bowl diamond.

A record of 48 home runs were hit in the Series, to surpass the mark of 30 homers set in the 1987 edition. Meanwhile, despite a crowd of 9,790 on opening night, the total attendance for the twelve-game tournament was less than 50,000, the worst in Series history.

Final standings

Individual leaders

All-Star Team

See also
Ballplayers who have played in the Series

Sources
 Nuñez, José Antero (1994). Serie del Caribe de la Habana a Puerto La Cruz. JAN Editor. 
 Bjarman, Peter (1994). Baseball with a Latin Beat : A History of the Latin American Game. McFarland & Company.

External links
Estadísticas Serie del Caribe 1990 (Spanish)

Caribbean
1990
Baseball competitions in Miami
1990 in American sports
1990 in sports in Florida
1990 in Caribbean sport